UR-AK49 is a drug used in scientific research which acts as a potent antagonist for the Neuropeptide Y / Pancreatic polypeptide receptor Y4, and also as a partial agonist at the histamine receptors H1 and H2. UR-AK49 is a pure antagonist at Y4 with no partial agonist effects, and although it is only slightly selective for Y4 over the related Y1 and Y5 receptors, as the first non-peptide Y4 antagonist developed UR-AK49 is expected to be useful in the study of this receptor and its role in the body.

References 

Histamine agonists
Imidazoles
Neuropeptide Y antagonists
Acylguanidines
Cyclohexyl compounds